Randy Frye (born July 7, 1955) is an American politician who has served in the Indiana House of Representatives from the 67th district since 2010.

References

1955 births
Living people
Republican Party members of the Indiana House of Representatives
21st-century American politicians